A referendum on becoming part of South Africa was held in South West Africa in May and June 1946. The referendum took the format of asking tribes  whether they wished to remain under South African rule. The number of people in the tribe was assigned to all having voted "yes" or "no" based on the return of a form to the government. However, the United Nations rejected allowing the mandate to join the Union of South Africa, stating that "the African inhabitants of South West Africa have not yet secured political autonomy or reached a stage of political development enabling them to express a considered opinion which the Assembly could recognize on such an important decision as incorporation of their territory."

Form
The tribes were presented with a form by the government:

Results

References

1946 referendums
Referendums in Namibia
1946 in South West Africa